The 2011 Abu Dhabi Grand Prix (formally the 2011 Formula 1 Etihad Airways Abu Dhabi Grand Prix) was the eighteenth and penultimate round of the 2011 Formula One season. It was held on 13 November 2011 at the Yas Marina Circuit on Yas Island, a man-made island on the outskirts of Abu Dhabi in the United Arab Emirates. It was the third running of the Abu Dhabi Grand Prix. As is customary with the race, it was the only twilight Grand Prix of the 2011 Formula One season, with a start time of 17:00 local time.

The race was won by McLaren's Lewis Hamilton. Second was Ferrari's Fernando Alonso, with Jenson Button coming third in the other McLaren.

Sebastian Vettel, having won both of the previous iterations of the race for Red Bull Racing-Renault, had been in pole position, but retired after a puncture in the first lap, near the second corner, which was his first retirement since the 2010 Korean Grand Prix, where he encountered a problem with his engine. As a result, this prevented him from equalling Michael Schumacher's record of 13 wins in one season, but Vettel did equal Nigel Mansell's 1992 record of 14 pole positions in one season. This was also the only race of 2011 in which neither Red Bull finished on the podium, as Vettel's teammate Mark Webber finished fourth.

Report

Background
Vitantonio Liuzzi returned to Hispania for the race, having been replaced by Narain Karthikeyan for the Indian Grand Prix to make way for him to drive in front of his home crowd.

Williams driver Pastor Maldonado took a ten-place grid penalty for exceeding his engine quota for the season.

In the week before the race, it was announced that the teams would trial several new compounds of tyre rubber in Friday practice, to offer tyre supplier Pirelli more feedback on their planned 2012 tyre compounds. Tyre supplier Pirelli brought its white-banded medium compound tyre as the harder "prime" tyre and the yellow-banded soft compound as the softer "option" compound, as opposed to the previous year where Bridgestone brought the red-banded super-soft compound as the option.

Formula Renault 3.5 Series champion Robert Wickens and runner-up Jean-Éric Vergne drove during free practice; Vergne drove for Toro Rosso, while Wickens drove for Virgin in place of Jérôme d'Ambrosio. GP2 Series champion Romain Grosjean also drove during free practice, for Renault.

The circuit included two DRS zones, each with their own independent detection points. The first detection point was located just before the Turn 7 hairpin, with its corresponding activation point positioned halfway down the long back straight; the second detection point was set after the exit of Turn 9, with its activation point adjacent to the secondary pit lane at Turn 10.

The drivers' representative on the stewards panel for the Grand Prix weekend was Derek Warwick.

Free practice
The first practice session saw Jenson Button set the fastest lap time, one tenth of a second ahead of Mark Webber and Lewis Hamilton. Hamilton had set the early pace, using Pirelli's experimental development tyres, but Webber and Sebastian Vettel surpassed him, and Button set his fastest lap time as the session drew to a close. Ferrari drivers Fernando Alonso and Felipe Massa experienced several off-track excursions between them. Romain Grosjean set a faster lap time than teammate Vitaly Petrov, though Petrov was forced to abandon his car during his final run with engine troubles. Rubens Barrichello was also forced out with technical problems, failing to set a lap time.

The second session was known for two separate incidents at Turn 1; Vettel spun and became stuck in the outside barrier early in the session, while Alonso crashed at the same place. Hamilton went on to set the fastest time, two-tenths faster than Button's fastest time in the first session.

Qualifying
Qualifying began with dusk approaching in Abu Dhabi, with Vettel looking to equal Nigel Mansell's record of 14 poles in a season. In the first session Rubens Barrichello had an oil leak, therefore unable to set a lap time, but was allowed to race. He joined the Lotuses, HRTs and Virgins in failing to make it to the second part of qualifying. In the second qualifying session, which took place as the sun went down, there was a red flag mid way, due to a loose bollard, which Massa drove over but escaped without damage. When the bollard was removed the session resumed. Sauber, Renault, Toro Rosso, and the remaining Williams car of Pastor Maldonado were all knocked out. Pastor Maldonado had been given a 10 place grid penalty for a ninth engine, so started in 23rd, just in front of his teammate on the back row of the grid. Hamilton led most of the final qualifying session, only to be beaten to pole position by Vettel, on Vettel's last lap. The order then followed with Button in 3rd, Webber 4th, then Alonso, Massa, Rosberg, Schumacher, Sutil, and di Resta, having not set a time in order to save tyres for the race.

Race
Vettel led into the first corner, but an unexplained puncture on his right rear tyre caused him to spin off the track at Turn 2 and suffer his first retirement of the season. Hamilton led the race afterwards, and won the race mostly untroubled. Alonso finished second after he overtook Button on lap 1, Button eventually finished third. Webber dropped to behind Alonso at the start, but remained fourth after Vettel's retirement. He battled with Button throughout the race, but to no avail, eventually finishing fourth. He was followed by Felipe Massa, the two Mercedes, the two Force Indias, and the two Saubers - with Kobayashi taking the final point and Pérez missing out in eleventh. Jérôme d'Ambrosio, Sébastien Buemi and Daniel Ricciardo were the other retirements of the race.

Classification

Qualifying

Notes
 – Pastor Maldonado was given a ten-place grid penalty for using his ninth engine of the season, exceeding the limit of eight engines.
 – Rubens Barrichello failed to set a lap time after his team discovered an oil leak following an engine change. As he had set practice times within 107% of the fastest driver's time, he was given permission to start the race.

Race

Notes
 – Pastor Maldonado (30 seconds) and Jaime Alguersuari (20 seconds) were given time penalties for ignoring blue flags, but did not alter their respective finishing positions.

Championship standings after the race 
Bold text indicates the World Champions.

Drivers' Championship standings

Constructors' Championship standings

 Note: Only the top five positions are included for both sets of standings.

See also 
 2011 GP2 Final

References

External links

Abu Dhabi
Abu Dhabi Grand Prix
Grand Prix
Abu Dhabi Grand Prix